St. Antony's Higher Secondary School is an educational institution providing scholastic education for boys. It is currently under the administration of the Roman Catholic Diocese of Thanjavur. It has a high school and a higher secondary school. English and Tamil are the medium of instruction. The headmaster of this school is appointed by the Diocese of Thanjavur. The current headmaster of this school is Fr. J. Antonysamy.

Campus infrastructure
It is located in Mary's Corner, behind the Sacred Heart Girl's Higher Secondary School. The campus houses six buildings: Britto Building, Don Bosco Hall, Main Building, Office, Anbu Illam and Old Hostel Building. It has a big football ground, two basketball courts, a volleyball court and a Kho-kho Ground. The campus has been operating its own eco-friendly Gobar gas plant ever since its inception. The campus also includes the St. Antony's Church and burial ground. The Annai Auditorium was constructed during 1995–96.

A former headmaster, Rev. Father S. Teresnathan Amalanather, later became the Bishop of Tuticorin.

References 

Boys' schools in India
Catholic secondary schools in India
Christian schools in Tamil Nadu
High schools and secondary schools in Tamil Nadu
Education in Thanjavur
Tamil-language schools